Beka Dartsmelia (born 21 March 2000) is a Georgian professional footballer who  plays as a midfielder for Newcastle Jets in the A-League Men. He has previously played for Georgian clubs Dinamo Tbilisi and Locomotive Tbilisi.

Club career

Newcastle Jets
In August 2022, Dartsmelia joined Newcastle Jets, signing a multi-year contract. He made his debut for the club on 15 October 2022 in a 2–1 win over Perth Glory.  Dartmelia scored his first goal for Newcastle in just his second appearance for the club in a 3–1 win over Wellington Phoenix.

References

External links

Living people
2000 births
Footballers from Georgia (country)
Georgia (country) youth international footballers
Georgia (country) under-21 international footballers
Expatriate footballers from Georgia (country)
Association football midfielders
Expatriate soccer players in Australia
FC Dinamo Tbilisi players
FC Locomotive Tbilisi players
Newcastle Jets FC players
Erovnuli Liga players